Asleep Versions is the fourth EP by English musician and producer Jon Hopkins, released on 11 November 2014. It is a reworking of four tracks from his 2013 album, Immunity.

Track listing

References

2014 EPs
Jon Hopkins albums
Domino Recording Company EPs